Adrián de la Fuente Barquilla (born 26 February 1999), sometimes known as Dela, is a Spanish footballer who plays as a central defender for Villarreal CF B.

Club career
Born in El Escorial, Community of Madrid, de la Fuente joined Real Madrid's La Fábrica in 2007, from CU Collado Villalba. On 10 January 2018, while still a youth, he signed a professional contract until 2022.

Promoted to the reserves in Segunda División B ahead of the 2018–19 season, de la Fuente made his senior debut on 26 August 2018, starting in a 2–0 home win over UD Las Palmas Atlético. Initially a regular starter in Santiago Solari's side, he lost his starting spot after the appointment of Raúl as manager.

On 14 September 2020, de la Fuente moved to another reserve team, after signing a three-year contract with Villarreal CF B also in the third division. He made his first team debut on 30 November of the following year, starting in a 8–0 away routing of Victoria CF, for the season's Copa del Rey.

De la Fuente made his professional debut with the B-side on 14 August 2022, starting in a 2–0 away win over Racing de Santander.

References

External links
Real Madrid profile

1999 births
Living people
Spanish footballers
Footballers from the Community of Madrid
Association football defenders
Segunda División players
Primera Federación players
Segunda División B players
Real Madrid Castilla footballers
Villarreal CF B players
Villarreal CF players
Spain youth international footballers